Ruis is a kreis in the Surselva district of Graubünden in Switzerland. The seat of the district office is in Rueun.

Ruis is situated in the middle of the Surselva valley and encompasses both sides of the valley ranging from Obersaxen to Waltensburg.

Ilanz/Glion